Psychopomporus is a genus of predaceous diving beetles in the family Dytiscidae. There is one described species in Psychopomporus, P. felipi, found in North America.

References

Further reading

 
 
 

Dytiscidae